Andrés Almarales Manga (1935 in Cienaga, Magdalena, Colombia – 7 November 1985, in Bogotá) was one of the commanders of the 19th of April Movement (M-19) liberation group. He was a member of the Colombian Communist Party. He worked with the socialist groups under Antonio Garcia and with the United People's Front with the priest, Camilo Torres. He received Haba guerrilla instruction in Cuba and communist countries of Europe.

Biography
Almarales was one of the founders of the M-19 and representative to the camera from the Socialist Anapo. He participated in stealing weaponry from the North Corner and in terrorist activities in the south of the country. His group recruited guerrillas and supporters in the union sector. Captured in the municipality of Bolivar (Santander) in 1979, Almares was put under house arrest and found guilty by Picota. When he rejoined civilian life, he wrote works on syndicalism and shortly thereafter helped plan the capture of the Dominican Republic. Later, his crimes were pardoned during the government of Belisario Betancur.

When Carlos Toledo Plata was assassinated in 1984 in Bucaramanga, Almares organized the memorial service in Romero park, in front of the central cemetery of that city, as an insult to then-president Belisario Betancur and the Time newspaper. His group recruited young people for the armed resistance movement. Shortly thereafter, he moved to the Valley of the Cauca and collaborated with the M-19 to protect around Cali. In a popular action by the Patriotic Union (Colombia) in the Plaza de Bolivar of Bogota, Almarales spoke rudely comparing the press to  a "sewer", referring to President Betancur, minister of Government Jaime Castro and the Colombian conservative group.

On 24 August 1984, he arranged a ceasefire between his group and the government of President Betancur. In front of all the television networks, he declared: "As of today, not a drop of blood was spilled by the subversives."

A radical and capable participant in negotiations, Almarales participated in the peace process. 

In November, 1985 he took part in the attack on the Palace of Justice in Bogota. Later he was buried alongside Luis Otero Cifuentes and Alfonso Jacquin. There are two versions of his death:

Most well-known: he committed suicide in the Palace with the hostages.
He was escorted by the military to the Florero House in Bogota where he was tortured and assassinated in the Usaquén Escuela de Caballeria and secretly buried in the Palace with the others similarly killed.

References

1985 deaths
1935 births
People from Magdalena Department
19th of April Movement members
Date of birth missing